Thomas Bunbury (1774 – 28 May 1846) was an Irish Conservative politician.

References

External links
 

UK MPs 1841–1847
Irish Conservative Party MPs
1774 births
1846 deaths